Information Society is the debut studio album by American synth-pop band Information Society, released on June 21, 1988, by Tommy Boy Records and Reprise Records. It was the band's first release under a major label, after two independently released extended plays. The album was certified gold by the Recording Industry Association of America (RIAA) on December 6, 1988, denoting shipments in excess of 500,000 copies in the United States. Four singles were released from the album, including "What's on Your Mind (Pure Energy)", the group's most commercially successful single to date. It was one of the only albums released in the seldom-used CD+G format.

Production
Information Society is one of the very few albums to have CD+G content. As the CD+G format never caught on and compatible players are difficult to find, the whole content was also made available on the band's website. "What's on Your Mind (Pure Energy)" and "Walking Away" were used in a sampler disc bundled with the Sega CD to showcase the console's CD+G capability. It had the same graphics as the album.

According to the CD+G notes, instruments used in the production of this album include: Akai S-900 sampler, E-MU SP-12 Drum Machine, Prophet 2002 Sampler (X2), Yamaha TX Rack Module (X8), Moog Minimoog Synthesizer, Roland Super Jupiter Synth (X3), Roland JX-3P Synth, Roland S-50 Synth. This album was recorded onto floppy disk via Voyetra Technology's "Sequencer Plus MK III" MIDI sequencer software in the summer of 1987. It was transferred to 48-track analog tape in autumn 1987, at which time vocals were added. The 48-track was then mixed down to a stereo master in winter 1987–1988.

Track listing
All tracks produced by Fred Maher, except "Running" by Paul Robb.

Personnel
Credits adapted from the liner notes of Information Society.

Information Society
 Paul Robb – arrangements, programming
 Kurt Valaquen – samples
 James Cassidy
 Amanda Kramer

Additional musicians
 Murat Konar – vocals 
 ELIZA – guest vocals

Technical

 Fred Maher – production, mixing, recording engineering ; arrangements, programming
 Paul Robb – production 
 Roey Shamir – mixing, mix engineering 
 Joey Gardner – mixing 
 "Little" Louie Vega – mixing 
 Kevin Laffey – executive production
 Chopper Black – recording engineering 
 Eric Calvi – mix engineering 
 Jon Smith – mix engineering 
 Oz Fritz – engineering assistance
 Angela Piva – engineering assistance
 The Latin Rascals (Tony Moran and Albert Cabrera) – edits 
 Herb Powers Jr. – mastering

Artwork
 Grey Organisation – art direction
 Isabel Snyder – photography
 Steven Miglio – layout
 Daniel Shapiro – typography

Charts

Certifications

References

External links
 Kurt Harland comments on Information Society
 Information Society’s CD+G content

1988 debut albums
Albums produced by Fred Maher
Electropop albums
Information Society (band) albums
Reprise Records albums
Tommy Boy Records albums